was in 2019 the Chair of the General Council of the World Trade Organization. He was selected on 7 March 2018. Ihara had held the Chair of the WTODSB in 2017.

Ihara served as Ambassador Extraordinary and Plenipotentiary of the Permanent Mission of Japan to the International Organizations in Geneva from November 2015 until his appointment in December 2019 to serve as the Ambassador Extraordinary and Plenipotentiary of Japan to France.

References

Ambassadors of Japan to France
Japanese diplomats
World Trade Organization people
Living people
Year of birth missing (living people)
Consuls General of Japan in Los Angeles